Huntington is the surname of three prominent families from the United States of America. The first was active in the eastern region; the second played an important role in the early Latter Day Saint movement, and pioneered and founded the State of Utah with Brigham Young; the third was active on both coasts and the regions linking them.  All three lines descend from Simon Huntington and his wife, Margaret Baret Huntington, who emigrated to America from Norwich, England, in 1633.

Political Huntingtons
Huntingtons involved in American politics from the 18th & 19th centuries include

Samuel Huntington (Scotland, Connecticut 1731–1796), Connecticut Superior Court Judge 1773–1785, Patriot in the American Revolution, Founding Father and Signer of the Declaration of Independence, President of and Delegate to the Continental Congress from Connecticut 1776–1784, Deputy Governor of Connecticut 1784–1786, Governor of Connecticut 1786–1796. Uncle and adoptive father of Samuel Huntington.
Jedediah Huntington (or Jedidiah Huntington) (Norwich, Connecticut August 4, 1743 – September 25, 1818), was an American brigadier general who served under General George Washington in the Continental Army during the American Revolutionary War. After the war, he served in numerous civilian posts.
Ebenezer Huntington (December 26, 1754 – June 17, 1834) was an officer in the Continental Army and is depicted as one of the officers of General Washington's Army in John Trumbull's Surrender of Lord Cornwallis. He served as a United States Representative from Connecticut after the war.
Jabez Huntington (7 August 1719 – 5 October 1786) was a merchant and politician from Connecticut Colony. Jabez Huntington graduated from Yale in 1741, engaged in the West India trade, and amassed a fortune. After 1759 he was frequently a member of the legislature, speaker for several years, and also a member of the council.
Jabaz W. Huntington (Norwich, Connecticut November 8, 1788 – November 1, 1847) was a United States representative and Senator from Connecticut.
Samuel Huntington (1765–1817), delegate to the Ohio Constitutional Convention 1802, Justice of the Ohio Supreme Court 1803–1808, Governor of Ohio 1808–1810. Nephew of and adoptive son of Samuel Huntington.
Elisha Mills Huntington (1806–1862), Indiana United States Representative 1832–1836, Indiana Circuit Court Judge 1837–1841, Judge of the U.S. District Court of Indiana 1842–1862, delegate to the Democratic National Convention 1860. Descendant of Samuel Huntington.
Nathaniel Huntington, Indiana United States Representative 1827–1828. Brother of Elisha Mills Huntington.
Arria Sargent Huntington (1848–1921) the first woman elected to public office in Syracuse, New York.
Pelatiah Webster Huntington, was a well-known political economist, author, and teacher during the late 1700s.
Pelatiah Webster Huntington, named after the well known economist, was the founder of Huntington Bancshares, largest bank by market share in Columbus, Ohio.

Placename honors

The Huntington Homestead Museum, Scotland, Connecticut
Huntington, New York
Huntington Bay, New York
Huntington Harbor Lighthouse, New York
Huntington Yacht Club, New York
Huntington, Massachusetts
Huntington Avenue, after Ralph Huntington (1784–1866), in Boston, Massachusetts
Huntington Avenue American League Baseball Grounds, Boston, Massachusetts
Huntington, Indiana
Huntington County, Indiana
Huntington Beach, California

Industrialists, business persons, and philanthropists

Huntingtons involved in American railroads, shipping, real estate, politics, mining, oil and extraction, arts patronage, and philanthropy since the 19th century include:
Collis Potter Huntington (Harwinton, Connecticut 1821–1900) and Arabella Duval Huntington (Union Springs, Alabama or Richmond, Virginia c. 1850–1924) Real estate investor, philanthropist and art and jewelry collector, abolitionist and suffragette known as "America's Wealthiest Woman" during the Gilded Age; Collis Huntington was one of the Big Four, also known as "The Associates", of the First transcontinental railroad, the Central Pacific, and include the Southern Pacific, Chesapeake and Ohio U.S. railroads and Newport News shipping industries. Through railroads, shipping, real estate, mining, oil, extraction, and art, rare book and jewelry collections, it is estimated that Collis and his cousin Henry amassed a fortune of between 30 and 50 billion dollars (adjusted for inflation and valuation, 2018).  Collis and Arabella were abolitionists married by Henry Ward Beecher and supported Booker T. Washington through funding Hampton Normal Agricultural Institute (now Hampton University) and Tuskegee Institute (now Tuskegee University).  Upon his death, Arabella financed the Collis P. Huntington Memorial Building at Tuskegee University which was dedicated to supporting one of the first programs educating black women and is still in use today.
Henry Edward Huntington (Oneonta, NY 1850–1927) and widowed Arabella Duval Huntington (c. 1850–1924); railroad magnate, Newport News Shipbuilding, Pacific Electric Railway, California state real estate developer where he founded, developed and incorporated holdings in Los Angeles, Beverly Hills, Huntington Beach and Orange County; botanical gardens developer and art and rare book collector; Henry was a native of Oneonta, NY and donated his former family homestead in Oneonta to become Huntington Memorial Library and park.  Henry and Arabella are founders of The Huntington Library, Art Collections and Botanical Gardens in San Marino, California which is where they are buried.
Archer Milton Huntington (1870–1955; See The Hispanic Society of America, Audubon Terrace, Mariners' Museum) Philanthropist, poet, Hispanic scholar, art collector and patron, museum and botanical gardens developer and Anna Hyatt Huntington (1876–1973) American sculptor (See Brookgreen Gardens & Atalaya Castle).  Archer founded and developed The Hispanic Society of America, Audubon Terrace and the Newport News Mariners' Museum projects as well as acting as a major benefactor for the American Academy of Arts and Letters and the American Numismatic Society. His early education was almost wholly independent, not unlike his father Collis and cousin Henry (Ed) and in early childhood he was educated through private tutors and extensive travel in Europe; he later would earn honorary degrees including a doctorate from Yale University as a Hispanic scholar and poet.  Archer, with his wife Anna, built Atalaya Castle and Brookgreen Gardens, both of which were donated upon his death to the State of South Carolina.  The nearly 10,000-acre parcel and two estates now comprise Huntington Beach State Park which focuses on wetland and habitat conversation.
Helen Dinsmore Huntington (1893–1976); American socialite, arts patron and political hostess. Descendant of the Huntington and Dinsmore families, who had adjoining Hudson River estates, Helen Huntington married Vincent Astor in 1914, and became a leader of New York society. In 2004 Andre Balazs acquired her family estate, The Locusts, once the setting for many of her soirees.

Placename honors
Collis P. Huntington State Park, Redding, Connecticut
Huntington Free Library and Reading Room – The Bronx, New York
Huntington Memorial Library,  Oneonta, New York
The Huntington Library, Art Collections and Botanical Gardens, in San Marino, California
Huntington Beach, California
Huntington Park, California
Huntington Lake, California
Huntington Hospital, Pasadena, California
Huntington Hotel [now the Langham Huntington Hotel] Pasadena, California
Huntington Hotel, San Francisco, California
Huntington, Texas
Huntington, West Virginia
Collis P. Huntington Historical Society and Railroad Museum, Huntington, West Virginia
Huntington Park, Virginia
Huntington Ingalls Industries, Newport News, Virginia 
Collis P. Huntington High School, Newport News, Virginia
Collis P. Huntington Memorial Building, Tuskegee University, Alabama
Huntington Beach State Park, South Carolina

Utah Pioneer Huntingtons

Huntingtons involved in founding the Church of Jesus Christ of Latter-day Saints and the State of Utah 

 Zina Diantha Huntington Jacobs Smith Young (Watertown, NY, 1821–1901) American Social Activist and suffragette, wife of Joseph Smith (founder of the Latter Day Saint movement) and Brigham Young (second president of the Church of Jesus Christ of Latter-day Saints (LDS Church)), she served as second (co-president) and third president of the LDS Relief Society.  Zina Diantha Huntington's father, William Huntington, was an early leader of the LDS Church, and she accompanied the Brigham Young Company expedition in pioneering and founding the State of Utah, along with her brothers, including Oliver Boardman Huntington, who acted as a scout for the Brigham Young Company.  She was polyandrous and was married to her husbands Jacobs and Smith at the same time; upon Smith's death, she married Brigham Young.

Placename honors 
 Huntington, Utah
 Huntington State Park, Utah
 Huntington North Dam, Utah

See also
List of United States political families
Huntington Bancshares

References

American families
Business families of the United States
Political families of the United States
American families of English ancestry
Lists of families